Laxitextum bicolor is a plant pathogen fungus. It is inedible.

References

External links 
 Index Fungorum
 USDA ARS Fungal Database

Russulales
Fungal plant pathogens and diseases
Fungi described in 1801
Inedible fungi
Taxa named by Christiaan Hendrik Persoon